Bourg-Achard is a commune in the Eure department in the Normandy region in northern France.

Geography
It is situated in the Roumois region of Normandy and sits at the junction of the motorways A13 (Paris-Caen) and A28 (Rouen-Le Mans),  from Paris.

Population

See also
Communes of the Eure department

References

Communes of Eure